The Maja e Arnenit Strict Nature Reserve is a strict nature reserve in the District of Prizren of Southeastern Kosovo. Maja e Arnenit has an area of 30 ha.

See also  
 Protected areas of Kosovo
 Geography of Kosovo
 Biodiversity of Kosovo

Notes

References 

Nature reserves in Kosovo
Protected areas established in 1960
1960 establishments in Yugoslavia
Natural monuments of Kosovo